The MD Helicopters MD 600N is a light utility civilian helicopter designed in the United States. It is a stretched eight-seat development of the five-seat MD 520N helicopter.

Design and development
McDonnell Douglas Helicopter Systems (MD Helicopters since 1999) first announced it was developing a stretched MD 520N in late 1994, at that time designated the MD 630N. The prototype, a modified MD 530F, had made its first flight on November 22, 1994. McDonnell Douglas gave the go-ahead for the production aircraft, redesignated the MD 600N, in March 1995.

McDonnell Douglas stretched the MD 520N fuselage by inserting a plug aft of the cockpit/cabin bulkhead and stretching the NOTAR tail boom. The larger fuselage allows for an extra (middle) row of seats. Other differences compared with the MD 520N include a new six blade main rotor (the MD 520N has a five blade unit) and an uprated Allison (now Rolls-Royce) Model 250 turboshaft.

The prototype was modified to MD 600N standard with a production standard engine and tail boom and flew in November 1995, followed the next month by the first MD 600N production prototype. Certification was awarded on May 15, 1997, and deliveries began that June.

Following the 1997 Boeing/McDonnell Douglas' merger, Boeing sold the former MD civil helicopter lines to Netherlands-based RDM Holdings in early 1999.

On March 8, 2017, MD Helicopters unveiled a concept variant known as the MD 6XX. Unlike the MD 600, the MD 6XX utilizes a traditional tail rotor and shares its T-tail design with the smaller MD 500/530F. It is currently in development, with certification originally expected in 2020.  However, certification has been delayed indefinitely.

Operators

 Meghna Group of Industries

 Air Vigilance Service (3)

 General Directorate of Security

 United States Border Patrol (retired)

Specifications (MD 600N)

See also

References

External links

 MD Helicopters MD 600N page

1990s United States helicopters
MD 600
NOTAR helicopters
1990s United States civil utility aircraft
Single-turbine helicopters
Aircraft first flown in 1994